A Fear of Strangers is a 1964 British TV drama starring Stanley Baker, who portrays a racist police inspector who attempts to coerce a black suspect into confessing to a murder he did not commit. Although written in 1958 it was banned for six years. The program was produced by Associated Television (ATV) and aired as an installment of Drama 64.

References

External links

1964 films
1964 drama films
Films directed by Herbert Wise
1960s English-language films
1960s British films
British drama television films